Carl Allan Carlsson (later Ekbäck, 8 November 1910 – 17 November 1983) was a Swedish boxer who won a bronze medal in the featherweight division at the 1932 Summer Olympics.

Known for his technical skills, Carlsson won four Swedish titles, as a featherweight in 1932 and as a lightweight in 1933, 1934 and 1936. He never turned professional. His brother Gösta also competed as a boxer.

1932 Olympic results
Below are the results of Allan Carlsson, a Swedish featherweight boxer who competed at the 1932 Olympic Games

 Round of 16: defeated Katsuo Kameoka (Japan) on points
 Quarterfinal: defeated John Hines (United States) on points
 Semifinal: lost to Carmelo Robledo (Argentina) on points
 Bronze Medal Bout: defeated Gaspare Alessandri (Italy) on points (won bronze medal)

References

1910 births
1983 deaths
Featherweight boxers
Olympic boxers of Sweden
Boxers at the 1932 Summer Olympics
Olympic bronze medalists for Sweden
Olympic medalists in boxing
Swedish male boxers
Medalists at the 1932 Summer Olympics
Sportspeople from Örebro
20th-century Swedish people